Alexander Minto Hughes (2 May 1945 – 13 March 1998), better known as Judge Dread, was an English reggae and ska musician. He was the first white recording artist to have a reggae hit in Jamaica, and the BBC has banned more of his songs than those of any other recording artist, because of his frequent use of sexual innuendo and double entendres. Following his death, Rolling Stone reported, "He sold several million albums throughout his 25-plus year career and was second only to Bob Marley in U.K. reggae sales during the 1970s".

Early life
Hughes was born on 2 May 1945. He was introduced to Jamaican music when he lodged as a teenager in a West Indian household in Brixton, South West London. Hughes, a heavily-built man, met Jamaican artists Derrick Morgan and Prince Buster through his job as a bouncer at London nightclubs such as the Ram Jam in Brixton, and through another job as a bodyguard. After working as a professional wrestler (under the name "The Masked Executioner") and as a debt collector for Trojan Records, he worked as a DJ on local radio. In the 1960s he was also sometimes employed to provide security to The Rolling Stones.

Music career
When Prince Buster had a big underground hit in 1969 with "Big 5", Hughes capitalized on it with the recording of his own "Big Six", based on Verne & Son's "Little Boy Blue", which was picked up by Trojan boss Lee Gopthal, and released on Trojan's 'Big Shot' record label under the stage name Judge Dread, the name taken from another of Prince Buster's songs. According to UK newspaper The Independent, this came about after he played the track to Trojan Records' production team in 1972: one of the team, Joe Sinclair, later recalled: "When Dread brought in his demo, we didn't exactly think it was a national hit but we reckoned we could pick up something around the region of 70,000 sales with the help of a change of title. You see, the Judge called it 'Little Boy Blue', whereas I thought 'Big Six' would create interest by making the association with Prince Buster's 'Big Five' more obvious. It sold 300,000 copies and spent 27 weeks in the British charts. In 1973, it even made No 1 in Africa." "Big Six" reached No. 11 in the UK Singles Chart in 1972, selling over 300,000 copies and spending six months on the chart, despite getting no radio airplay due to its lyrics. Further hit singles followed with "Big Seven" (co-written by Rupie Edwards) and "Big Eight" – both following the pattern of lewd versions of nursery rhymes over a reggae backing – as well as "Y Viva Suspenders" and "Up with the Cock".

He was the first white recording artist to have a reggae hit in Jamaica, leading him to travel to Jamaica to perform live, where many were surprised that he was white. Dread had 11 UK chart hits in the 1970s, which was more than any other reggae artist (including Bob Marley). The Guinness Book of World Records credited Judge Dread for having the highest number (eleven) of banned songs of all time. Several of his songs mentioned Snodland, the small town in Kent where Judge Dread lived, including "The Belle of Snodland Town". There is a road in the town of Snodland named after him, Alex Hughes Close.

Judge Dread was also a songwriter, coming to the attention of Elvis Presley, who had planned to record "A Child's Prayer" as a Christmas gift to his daughter Lisa Marie in 1977, but died before the scheduled recording date. Dread helped organise a benefit concert featuring The Wailers and Desmond Dekker and released a benefit single titled "Molly". Despite its lack of innuendo in the lyrics, the track was still banned from radio airplay, and failed to chart. Recordings Dread issued under the pseudonyms JD Alex and Jason Sinclair were banned by the BBC.

Death
Judge Dread died from a heart attack as he walked off stage after performing at The Penny Theatre in Canterbury on 13 March 1998. According to The Times his last reported words were: "Let's hear it for the band!" When he collapsed, the audience at first thought that this was part of the act. An off-duty paramedic in the crowd realised that it was not and attempted resuscitation; shortly afterwards Dread was taken to the Kent and Canterbury Hospital where he was pronounced dead.

Legacy
Writing in The Independent following Dread's death, Pierre Perrone noted: "His stage act, mixing vaudeville, music hall, single entendres and damn-right cheek was undoubtedly a major influence on Ian Dury (check out "Razzle in My Pocket", the B side of "Sex and Drugs and Rock and Roll") and Buster Bloodvessel, who used to end Bad Manners' shows by baring his huge buttocks, a very Judge Dread move indeed".

Discography

Albums

EPs

Singles

See also
List of reggae musicians
List of people from Kent
Trojan skinhead
Record Mirror
Caribbean music in the United Kingdom

References

External links

The Judge Dread Memorial Site
Obituary at The Dead Musician Directory
Fansite

1945 births
1998 deaths
English songwriters
English male singers
Musicians from Kent
Musicians who died on stage
British ska musicians
English reggae musicians
Trojan Records artists
People from Snodland
20th-century English singers
British novelty song performers
Obscenity controversies in music
20th-century British male singers
British male songwriters